Hamy is a French surname of Arabic origin. Notable people with this surname include:

 Ernest Hamy (1842–1908), French anthropologist and ethnologist
 Maurice Hamy (1861–1936), French astronomer
 Paul Hamy (born 1982), French actor and model 

Surnames of Arabic origin